Thomas Bond Walker (1861 London - 1933) was an Irish painter.

Walker moved to Belfast in the 1880s and started exhibiting with the Belfast Art Society.  According to the 1911 Census of Ireland, Tom Bond Walker, a widower by this time, and his only child, David Bond Walker (b. 1892) were residing at Rushfield Avenue, in the upper Ormeau Road area of south Belfast.  Tom is specified as a ‘Portrait Painter.’

To augment his income he tutored private pupils, one of whom was Paul Henry. Henry recalled Walker as "a shy, retiring, ineffectual little man with a genuine enthusiasm for teaching". Henry was sixteen when he first met Walker, an encounter which Henry later described as having “changed the whole course” of his life by being introduced to oil paints.

Walker later introduced Henry to the paintings of Robert W. Fraser (fl. 1874-c.1901), whose work he greatly admired. Fraser often painted scenes of rivers, estuaries and boats. Henry's seascapes date from this period and the influence of Fraser is evident.

References

19th-century Irish painters
20th-century Irish painters
Irish male painters
1861 births
1933 deaths
19th-century Irish male artists
20th-century Irish male artists